Imamganj Assembly constituency is an assembly constituency for Bihar Legislative Assembly in Gaya district of Bihar, India. It comes under Aurangabad (Bihar Lok Sabha constituency).

Members of the legislative assembly

Election Results

2020

References

External links
 

Assembly constituencies of Bihar